This is the discography of the American band The Jayhawks. It lists their original singles, LPs, and compilations. It also includes band member's solo albums.

Studio albums

Compilations

Live albums

Singles

Other appearances

Solo releases

Gary Louris solo
Vagabonds (2008)
Acoustic Vagabonds (2008)

Mark Olson solo 
The Salvation Blues (2007)
Many Colored Kite (2010)
Good-bye Lizelle (2014)

Mark Olson & Gary Louris
Ready for the Flood (2009)

Tim O'Reagan solo
Topeka Oratorio (2002) (with The Leatherwoods)
Tim O'Reagan (2006)

Marc Perlman solo
25:32:47 EP (2009) (with Janey Winterbauer)

Kraig Johnson solo
Kraig Jarret Johnson (2004)

References

External links
 Official website
 

The Jayhawks
Discographies of American artists
Rock music group discographies
Alternative rock discographies